Hope & Glory is the first solo album by Heart singer Ann Wilson, released on September 11, 2007.

Hope & Glory is an album of covers that features guest appearances from Elton John, k.d. lang, Alison Krauss, Gretchen Wilson, Shawn Colvin, Rufus Wainwright, Wynonna Judd and Deana Carter. Ann's sister, Nancy, also contributed.

The Hope & Glory version of Led Zeppelin's "Immigrant Song" is available on Ann's Official My Space page, and charted as "the #9 most podcasted song of 2007" on the PMC Top10's annual countdown.

Track listing

Production
Produced By Ben Mink
Engineers: Rick DePofi, Dave Dysart, Masa Fukudome, Scott Lehrer, David Leonard, Patrick MacDougall, Brandon McWhorter, Ben Mink,  Bart Pursley, Tom Schick, Matt Still
Assistant Engineers: David Eaman, Gordon Hammond, Jason Lefan, Brandon McWhorter
Mixing: David Leonard, Patrick MacDougall 
Mastering: Stephen Marcussen

Personnel
Teddy Borowiecki: Piano, Accordion
David Eaman: Banjo
Ric Markmann: Electric Bass
David Piltch: Electric & Upright Bass
Ben Mink: Electric, Acoustic, Steel, Lap Steel & Bass Guitars, Fiddle, Percussion, Violin & Baritone Violin, Keyboards, Organ, Charango, Mandocello, Cuatro, Handclapping
Ben Smith, Randall Stoll: Drums, Percussion
Deana Carter, Shawn Colvin, Ingrid Friesen, Wynonna Judd, Alison Krauss, k.d. lang, Rufus Wainwright, Gretchen Wilson: Guest & Duet Vocals

Footnotes

2007 debut albums
Rounder Records albums
Covers albums